Buzzsaw was a station that played a harder-than-normal blend of classic rock, including early heavy metal, Southern rock, glam metal and arena rock on Sirius Satellite Radio channel 19 and Dish Network channel 6019.

Artists played on the channel included Led Zeppelin, AC/DC, Ozzy Osbourne, Black Sabbath (including both the Ozzy Osbourne and Ronnie James Dio periods), Van Halen, Aerosmith, Rush, ZZ Top, Lynyrd Skynyrd, Queen, Metallica, Guns N' Roses, Lizzy Borden, Mötley Crüe, The Black Crowes, and Jimi Hendrix.

The channel entered the Sirius lineup in early 2004. Prior to that time, there were three channels that played music that would later be played on Buzzsaw: The Rock, The Vault, and Big Rock. The Rock focused on the hits of classic rock; The Vault on the "deeper cuts" of classic rock; and Big Rock defined itself as "stadium rock" (mostly glam metal with some arena rock). In that round of channel changes, The Rock was subdivided into Classic Vinyl and Classic Rewind while Big Rock was replaced with Hair Nation. BuzzSaw would have essentially been viewed as the other successor to Big Rock; the arena rock that wasn't played on Hair Nation was generally played on BuzzSaw.

On November 12, 2008, Sirius XM Radio has announced its new, shared channel lineup, with a number of channels being renamed or replaced in the wake of the satcasters' merger. Sirius BuzzSaw channel 19 was removed and replaced with the previously XM-exclusive station The Bone Yard, which aired a limited engagement known as "AC/DC Radio Takeover".  AC/DC Radio's limited run ended on January 14, 2009.

Schedule

As with many Sirius channels, BuzzSaw was voicetracked.

Weekdays

Weekends

See also
 List of Sirius Satellite Radio stations

External links
 Sirius Buzzsaw

Defunct radio stations in the United States